Herbert Márquez (born 30 November 1963) is a Venezuelan footballer. He played in 17 matches for the Venezuela national football team from 1985 to 1994. He was also part of Venezuela's squad for the 1987 Copa América tournament.

References

External links
 

1963 births
Living people
Venezuelan footballers
Venezuela international footballers
Association football forwards
People from Puerto la Cruz
20th-century Venezuelan people
21st-century Venezuelan people